The 2023 Nobel Prize in Literature is an international literary prize established according to Alfred Nobel's will that will be announced by the Swedish Academy in Stockholm, Sweden, in 2023 and awarded on 10 December 2023.

Nominations
Every year, beginning in November of last year, thousands of letters across the world are sent to the Swedish Academy, endorsing well celebrated and little-known authors for the Nobel Prize. Such nominations can only be done by qualified nominators, namely members of the Swedish Academy and of other academies, institutions and societies which are similar to it in construction and purpose; professors of literature and of linguistics at universities and colleges; previous Nobel Prize laureates in Literature; and chairpersons of writers' organizations qualifying as representative of their countries' production of literature and belles lettres. Among the fundamental rules in making nominations include not making them public – but some still do as previous years – nor nominating oneself which automatically disqualifies the nominee during deliberations. 

Despite the secrecy, many notable writers around the globe are perennially expected to be among the official nominees and favored to win the prestigious literary prize. Among these living authors include Albania's Kadare; America's Auster, Davis, DeLillo, Hustvedt, Kincaid, King, McCarthy, Nussbaum, Oates, Palahniuk, Pynchon, Tyler and White; Argentina's Aira; Brazil's Buarque and Santiago; Britain's Barnes, Byatt, Churchill, Gaiman, Kelman, McEwan, Rushdie and Stoppard; Canada's Atwood, Carson and Ondaatje; Cape Verde's Almeida; Chile's Allende; China's Bei Dao, Can Xue, Yan Lianke; Croatia's Ugrešić; Czech Republic's Kundera; Egypt's Al Aswany and Ibrahim; Estonia's Kareva; France's Cixous, Condé, Houellebecq, Kristeva, Michon, and Sollers; Germany's Habermas, Schlink, Sloterdijk and Strauss; Hungary's Krasznahorkai and Nádas; India's Desai, Ghosh and Roy; Israel's Grossman; Italy's Agamben, Magris and Maraini; Jamaica's Goodison, Miller, and Johnson; Japan's Murakami, Ogawa and Yoshimoto; Ireland's Banville, Muldoon, O'Brien and Tóibín; Kenya's wa Thiong'o; Korea's Hwang Sok-yong, Ko Un and Lee Hae-in; Mexico's Aridjis, Poniatowska and Rivera Garza; Netherland's Nooteboom; Norway's Fosse, Knausgård, Lindstrøm and Solstad; Oceania's Carey, Grace, Ihimaera, Malouf, Murnane and Wendt; Philippines' Dalisay Jr.; Poland's Tulli; Portugal's Lobo Antunes; Romania's Cărtărescu and Țepeneag; Rwanda's Mukasonga; Russia's Bykov, Sorokin, Petrushevskaya and Ulitskaya; Spain's Goytisolo, Montero, Muñoz Molina and Vila-Matas; Somalia's Farah; South Africa's Vladislavic; Syria's Adunis and Barakat; Ukraine's Kostenko (nominated in 1967), Kurkov and Zhadan; and Vietnam's Dương Thu Hương.

Nobel Committee
The Swedish Academy's 2023 Nobel Committee is composed of the following members:

References

External links
The Nobel Prize in Literature nobelprize.org
Swedish Academy svenskaakademien.se/en

2023
Nobel Literature